Professor Richard Weston (born 1953) is an architect, landscape architect, author and is also the Chair of Architecture at Cardiff University.  He is Director of Richard Weston Studio Ltd and Earth Images Ltd.

Professional background

Weston was born in Leicester in 1953. He attended Wyggeston Boys Grammar School.  He went on to study architecture at Manchester University, gaining a BA in 1975 and BArch in 1977.  Supported by the Thouron Award, he attended the University of Pennsylvania (USA) to study landscape architecture, gaining an MLA (Penn) in 1979.  From 1979–1982 he worked in practice and was appointed as a lecturer at the Welsh School of Architecture (WSA) in Cardiff.  He subsequently taught at the Leicester and Portsmouth schools of architecture before returning to Cardiff in 1999 as a professorial research fellow.  In 2003 he was appointed to the Chair of Architecture, a position he holds today.

In addition to his teaching at the WSA, he is editor of arq (Architectural Research Quarterly, Cambridge University Press) and director of Richard Weston Studio Ltd and Earth Images Ltd.  Alongside his teaching duties, Weston is an experienced researcher with numerous books and publications to his name.  Most notably, he is author of two award-winning books, a monograph on the architect Alvar Aalto and a study of the modernist movement titled Modernism.  In addition he is the author of the definitive work on the life and achievements of Sydney Opera House architect, Jørn Utzon. Famously reclusive and private, Utzon granted Weston unlimited access to his archives and himself, enabling the publication of a unique study.

Architectural work

In 1992, Weston designed a glass roof to cover the sunken courtyard of a house built in a redundant water tank in Hampshire. Formed of stainless steel 'gutter trusses' whose profile, like a river, widens and deepens in response to the flow of water, and between them span laminated glass arches, with an interlayer to reduce heat gain from the sun.

Weston's interest in structural glass found dramatic expression in a house he built for himself as part of FutureWorld (an exhibition designed to provide the public with a glimpse of the way homes might operate in the 21st century) in Milton Keynes.  The 5.5 tonne stressed-skin plywood roof of Radiant House is supported only by glass – a feat achieved in collaboration with engineer Mark Lovell.

In 2002, he entered two architectural competitions, taking the opportunity they posed to explore ideas.  The first for the Royal Playhouse in Copenhagen (in collaboration with John Pardey Architects and eventually won by Lundgaard & Tranberg Arkitekter, who went on to build it) and the second for the Great Egyptian Museum in Cairo.  Whilst it did not win, the proposal, consisting of a 230m limestone dome, was selected for publication by the judges and Weston's learning of the Egyptians' fascination with the stars later became an inspiration for the designs for his own house and studio in Sully, South Wales - although sadly this was to remain on the drawing board.

Competitions and buildings
Grand Egyptian Museum (selected for publication), 2002
Royal Playhouse, Copenhagen, 2002
Finalist in two-stage open competition for National Wildflower Centre, Liverpool, 1997
Finalist in two-stage open competition for Public Artwork, Hamilton, 1997
Glass Roof for Howard Smith, Hampshire (pub. Architectural Review, 8/97)
Radiant House, FutureWorld, Milton Keynes, 1994

One-man shows
Robert Phillips Gallery, Walton on Thames, 2005
Aberdare Museum 2006
National Botanic Garden of Wales, 2007*
National Waterfront Museum, 2007–08
Oxford University Museum of Natural History, 2008*
Utzon Center, Aalborg, 2008.

Group shows
Royal Academy of Arts Summer Exhibition 1992, 1994, 1996, 2004.
"Through the lens", Royal West of England Academy, June–July 2008

Prizes
Techniquest Millennium Award for Solar System Sculpture for Wales, 1998.
American Institute of Architects International Book Award for Modernism, 1996.
2nd Prize, Letchworth Garden City Centenary landscape master plan, 1997.
Sir Banister Fletcher Prize for 'architecture book of the year', for Alvar Aalto, 1995.
Winner, 'Critics Competition' organised by the Architectural Review, 1987.

Publications

Books
"Architecture Visionaries", Laurence King, 320p, 2015.
100 Ideas that Changed Architecture, Laurence King, 2011. 
Quartz, 64pp, Deukalion Press, 2007.
Formations: images from rocks, 112pp, Deukalion Press, 2007.
Plans, Sections and Elevations. Key Buildings of the 20th Century, 240p, Laurence King, 2004.
Materials, Form and Architecture, Laurence King, 240p, 2003: second edition in preparation for publication in 2015.
Utzon. Inspiration, Vision, Architecture, Edition Bløndal, 432p, 2002.
The House in the Twentieth Century, 272p, Laurence King, 2002.
Modernism, Phaidon Press, 240p, 1996.
Alvar Aalto, Phaidon Press, 240p, 1995.
Säynätsalo Town Hall, Phaidon Press, 62p, 1993.
Villa Mairea, Phaidon Press, 62p, 1992.
Schools of Thought, Hampshire C. C., 152p, 1991.

Other
Regular contributor to complete works of Norman Foster.
More than 100 articles in leading architectural and other journals and newspapers.

Broadcasts
'The Next Big Thing', 7-episode BBC2 series tracing development of new products including scarves made using images from minerals and rocks (to be broadcast April–May 2011)
Sydney (Soap) Opera House, Uden Associates for C5, 13.8.00.
Agenda 21, with Daniel Libeskind and Ken Yeang, BBC World Service, 23.4.00.
In Our Time with Daniel Libeskind and Melvyn Bragg, BBC Radio 4, 25.3.99.
Several appearances on Turning World with Jenny Murray and other radio programmes inc. 'Night Waves' on Radio 3.

Design work

Described by the Independent on Sunday as "the break out star of Britain's Next Big Thing", he appeared in the seven-part BBC2 television series tracing the development of new products for leading retailers.

Using high-resolution scanners, he has generated designs for a collection of silk scarves from natural materials such as minerals and stones. This idea was presented at the 'Best of British Open Design Call' at Liberty of London (the world's leading retailer of scarves) and, since their debut on the shelves in 2010, have quickly established themselves as amongst Liberty's best selling lines.

The images, which can be printed on most natural and man-made fibres, offer a wide range of application in architecture, interior design and fashion.  In addition to the scarves, they have appeared in Liza Bruce's new ranges of swimwear.  Architectural applications are also currently being developed, with leading British architects Patel Taylor featuring an 'agate façade' in a house in Camden Town.  The London Olympic Games in 2012 followed suit, with four 5x3m images greeting athletes in the Olympic Village in Stratford. Weston's most recent public work is a four-storey banner installed in the atrium of the new Health Library at the Heath Hospital in Cardiff.

The scope of Weston's work has been extended by the purchase, in September 2014, of a sophisticated optical microscope and he is gaining increasing recognition internationally, with publications in the USA (Vincent Mok in Maniac Magazine, May 2013, p58-9), Ukraine (in Russian in Salon magazine, September 2013, p82-7) and The Netherlands (Mark magazine, June/July 2014, p160-167), as well as in two books on textile design published in the UK, the first by Melanie Bowles, Digital Textile Design (Laurence King, 2012), the second, Simon Clarke's Print: Fashion, Interiors, Art (Laurence King, 2014).

References

External links

People educated at Wyggeston Grammar School for Boys
Architects from Leicester
English writers
Living people
1953 births
Architecture academics
Academics of Cardiff University